Barbara Mean (born 5 January 1950) is a British sprint canoer who competed in the late 1960s. She finished eighth in the K-2 500 m event at the 1968 Summer Olympics in Mexico City.

References
Sports-reference.com profile

1950 births
Canoeists at the 1968 Summer Olympics
Living people
Olympic canoeists of Great Britain
British female canoeists